Jennifer Ann Abruzzo is an American attorney and government official who serves as General Counsel at the National Labor Relations Board (NLRB). She previously was Special Counsel for Strategic Initiatives for Communications Workers of America (CWA), the largest media and communications union in the United States. She had previously worked for the NLRB for over 20 years in a number of positions, including Deputy General Counsel and Acting General Counsel.

Early life and career 
A native of Queens, New York City, Abruzzo was raised in a "large Roman Catholic family". Abruzzo began her nearly 23-year career at the National Labor Relations Board (NLRB) as a field attorney in Miami, eventually rising to the position of Deputy General Counsel during the Obama administration. Abruzzo later served as acting general counsel in advance of the confirmation of Peter B. Robb to the position.

Abruzzo became special counsel for strategic initiatives at Communications Workers of America (CWA) in February 2018. In 2019, the AFL–CIO recommended Abruzzo for a vacant Democratic seat on the NLRB. During the presidential transition of Joe Biden, she served as an advisor to the President-elect on matters of labor policy.

General Counsel of the National Labor Relations Board

Nomination 
President Joe Biden nominated Jennifer Abruzzo to become the General Counsel of the NLRB on February 17, 2021 after firing the previous General Counsel, Peter B. Robb. Following her confirmation hearing, Abruzzo was confirmed by the Senate in a 51-50 vote, with all Democrats voting in favor and all Republicans voting against, and Vice President Kamala Harris breaking the tie in favor of Abruzzo's confirmation. She is the second woman to ever serve as NLRB general counsel, after Rosemary Collyer.

The confirmation of Abruzzo received support from unions, and she is expected to improve the investigative and enforcement capacity of NLRB lawyers by reversing budget cuts and staffing reductions implemented during the tenure of her predecessor, as well as ratify actions taken by acting general counsel Peter Sung Ohr after Robb was fired.

Tenure 
As General Counsel Abruzzo issued a memo declaring that college athletes have the right to organize. In office, Abruzzo has pushed for the NLRB to protect immigrants' rights to organize, regardless of their immigration status. In October 2021, Abruzzo stated that employees who participated in Black Lives Matter protests were protected under federal labor law. The success of the Amazon Labor Union organizing drive at the company's JFK8 facility in Staten Island, New York has been attributed in part to Abruzzo's leadership at the NLRB.

In April 2022, Abruzzo issued a memorandum calling for the NLRB to find captive audience meetings unlawful.

References

External links

Living people
Year of birth missing (living people)
National Labor Relations Board officials
Biden administration personnel
Women government officials
American labor lawyers
Communications Workers of America people
People from Queens, New York